Badley Moor is an  biological Site of Special Scientific Interest  east of Dereham in Norfolk. It is part of the Norfolk Valley Fens Special Area of Conservation.

This area of spring fed fen and grassland in the valley of the River Tud has tufa hummocks formed by the deposit of calcium carbonate. It has an exceptionally rich fen community with a carpet of moss on wet slopes with many unusual plants. There are overgrown dykes with flora including narrow-leaved water-parsnip and water dropwort.

There is access by a short track from Dumpling Green.

References

Sites of Special Scientific Interest in Norfolk
Special Areas of Conservation in England